Carston may refer to:

Robert Carston Arneson (1930–1992), American sculptor and professor of ceramics
Cecil Carston (1927–2014), New Zealand cricketer
Robyn Carston, linguist and academic specialising in pragmatics, semantics and the philosophy of language
Carston Catcheside OBE (1899–1987), English rugby union player

See also
Carson (surname)
Garston (disambiguation)
Karsten